Bryce Jiron Cotton (born August 11, 1992) is an American professional basketball player for the Perth Wildcats of the National Basketball League (NBL). He played college basketball for the Providence Friars, where he was a two-time first-team All-Big East honoree. He joined the Austin Spurs in 2014 before splitting the next two years in the NBA and NBA Development League, and spending time in China and Turkey. He spent the back-end of the 2014–15 season with the Utah Jazz and had short stints with the Phoenix Suns and Memphis Grizzlies during the 2015–16 season. In January 2017, he arrived in Australia to play for the Wildcats. Two months later, he guided Perth to the NBL championship behind a Grand Final MVP performance. He continued on with the Wildcats for the 2017–18 season and won the NBL Most Valuable Player Award. He won his second and third NBL championships in 2019 and 2020 while also garnering his second NBL MVP and second Grand Final MVP in 2020. He won his third NBL MVP in 2021.

Early life
Cotton was born and raised in Tucson, Arizona. He loved sports as a child, playing basketball, football and baseball. Due to suffering from a rare form of epilepsy, he was advised during fifth grade to no longer play football due to the high risk of head injuries which could lead to seizures. Focusing on basketball, one of Cotton's biggest deficiencies was his lack of height. He worked with his uncle, former NFL player David Adams, for an edge to combat taller opponents. Cotton's parents separated when he was a toddler and his father worked as a police officer on the other side of the country. Money was tight and Adams often provided them with financial assistance during tough times. Cotton's grandmother, Mary, helped raise him and his brother Justin while their mother worked in real estate.

After spending his junior year in Las Vegas, Cotton completed secondary school at Palo Verde High School in Tucson. Cotton helped lead Palo Verde to a 24–7 record and a berth in the state 4A semifinals in the 2009–10 season. He averaged 23.6 points, 7.5 rebounds, 4.0 assists and 3.7 steals per game as a senior, and scored 30 or more points nine times, including a career-high 40 points in an 85–82 win over Buckeye on February 16, 2010. He also set a school record for the highest triple-double with 37 points, 11 rebounds and 11 assists against Rio Rico on December 11, 2009. He earned First Team All-City and First Team All-State honors in 2010. He also had perfect grades and a high GPA.

Cotton was not highly recruited out of high school. He was turned down by Montana State and Northern Arizona, and was later also turned away by Division II school Chico State. He also reportedly tried to obtain a scholarship from Houston Baptist.

College career

Freshman season
Cotton's family could not afford to pay for college tuition and his scholarship dream looked over until Providence College made an offer just three days before freshman orientation. After reportedly signing with Miami Dade College on August 18, 2010, Cotton instead committed to the Providence Friars on August 30. He scored 15 points in the Friars' season opener against Dartmouth on November 13, 2010. In 31 games as a freshman, Cotton averaged 4.0 points and 1.5 rebounds in 15.3 minutes per game.

Sophomore season
As a sophomore in 2011–12, Cotton became a starter and was the team's second leading scorer, averaging 14.3 points per game while shooting 37.9 percent from 3-point range. On December 10, 2011, Cotton scored 20 of his career-high 34 points in the first half of the Friars' 72–61 win over Bryant. He went 11-of-16 from the field with a perfect 10-of-10 from the free throw line against Bryant. He later scored 27 points on 5-of-6 shooting from the field, with a perfect 5-of-5 from 3-point range and 10-of-12 from the free throw line against Louisville on January 10, 2012.

Junior season
Despite reports of Cotton leaving Providence following his sophomore season, he continued on with the Friars in 2012–13.

Following a breakout sophomore year, Cotton came into his junior season still in the shadows of senior point guard Vincent Council. Cotton was forced to step into the forefront for Providence to make up for injuries in the backcourt to Council and highly touted freshman guard Kris Dunn. Cotton also had to take on a leadership role with a young team. He registered his first career double-double with 24 points and 11 rebounds against Bryant on November 12, 2012. On December 1, he injured his knee and missed the second half against Mississippi State. It turned out he had torn his meniscus, but decided to play through the pain for the rest of the season. He scored a season-high 33 points and was 7-of-14 from 3-point territory against Boston College on December 22. He led the Big East Conference in scoring with 18.3 points per game, becoming the fifth Friar all-time to lead the league in scoring. He subsequently earned first-team All-Big East honors. In total, Cotton averaged 19.7 points, 3.6 rebounds and 2.9 assists in 37.8 minutes per game over 32 games.

During the off-season, Cotton had surgery to repair his meniscus.

Senior season
To conclude the 2013–14 regular season, Cotton was the only player in the nation to average more than 40 minutes per game (40.1), having averaged 41.9 minutes in Big East competition. His high minutes per game were as a result of Providence's six overtime games, four of which went to a second overtime. In those four double-overtime outings, Cotton played 200 minutes of a possible 200 minutes. His tireless play carried the Friars to their best season in a decade, as they headed into the Big East tournament with a 20–11 record. After going 3–0 in the Big East tournament, the Friars reached the NCAA Tournament for the first time since 2004. It marked Providence's first Big East tournament title since 1994, and Cotton was selected as the tournament MVP. In Providence's 79–77 loss to North Carolina in the NCAA tournament, Cotton scored a career-high 36 points.

In 35 games as a senior, Cotton averaged 21.8 points, 3.5 rebounds, 5.9 assists and 1.0 steals per game. He led the Big East in assists and was second in scoring. He subsequently earned first-team All-Big East honors for the second straight season, as well as being named to the AP Honorable Mention All-America Team. He finished his career ranked fourth all-time in scoring at Providence (1,975 points), and became the fifth player from a major conference to average 20-plus points and five-or-more assists in a season since 2002.

College statistics

|-
| style="text-align:left;"| 2010–11
| style="text-align:left;"| Providence 
| 31 || 1 || 15.3 || .387 || .259 || .784 || 1.5 || .5 || .7 || .0 || 4.0
|-
| style="text-align:left;"| 2011–12
| style="text-align:left;"| Providence
| 32 || 32 || 38.6 || .413 || .379 || .891 || 2.5 || 2.3 || 1.0 || .2 || 14.3
|-
| style="text-align:left;"| 2012–13
| style="text-align:left;"| Providence
| 32 || 31 || 37.8 || .437 || .364 || .798 || 3.6 || 2.9 || .9 || .1 || 19.7
|-
| style="text-align:left;"| 2013–14
| style="text-align:left;"| Providence
| 35 || 35 || 39.9 || .419 || .367 || .853 || 3.5 || 5.9 || 1.0 || .1 || 21.8
|- class="sortbottom"
| style="text-align:center;" colspan="2"| Career
| 130 || 99 || 33.2 || .421 || .361 || .838 || 2.8 || 3.0 || .9 || .1 || 15.2

Professional career

NBA, D-League, China, and Turkey (2014–2016)
After going undrafted in the 2014 NBA draft, Cotton signed with the San Antonio Spurs on July 7, 2014. He played in six Summer League games and five preseason games for the Spurs, before being waived on October 23, 2014. He subsequently joined the Spurs' NBA Development League affiliate team, the Austin Spurs, and appeared in 34 games (all starts), averaging 22.4 points (third in the D-League), 4.7 rebounds, 4.6 assists and 1.3 steals in 40.5 minutes (first in the D-League) per contest. Cotton scored in double figures on 31 occasions and recorded 20-plus points in 20 games. He also registered 40-or-more points twice, including a season-high 43 points, eight rebounds, nine assists and two steals against the Reno Bighorns on February 19, 2015. He was named D-League Performer of the Week on February 23 after averaging 30.0 points, 5.7 rebounds, 5.3 assists and 1.3 steals for the week. Earlier that month, he was named to the Western Conference All-Star team for the NBA D-League All-Star Game. At the season's end, he was named All-NBA D-League Second Team and NBA D-League All-Rookie First Team.

On February 24, 2015, Cotton signed a 10-day contract with the Utah Jazz. He made his NBA debut three days later, recording three points, two rebounds, one assist and one steal in just under seven minutes off the bench in a 104–82 win over the Denver Nuggets. He signed a second 10-day contract with the Jazz on March 6, and a multi-year deal on March 16. Over the final four games of the season, he averaged 14.3 points per game, scoring in double figures all four times, including a season-high 21 points against the Dallas Mavericks on April 13. In 15 games for the Jazz in 2014–15, he averaged 5.3 points, 1.2 rebounds and 1.0 assists in 10.6 minutes per game.

After playing for the Jazz during the Summer League and preseason, Cotton was waived by Utah on October 20, 2015. He subsequently re-joined the Austin Spurs for the 2015–16 season. On November 25, 2015, after four games with Austin, Cotton signed with the Phoenix Suns. Cotton's long-awaited debut for the Suns came over a month later on December 30, following injuries to Eric Bledsoe and Ronnie Price. He scored two points on 1-of-6 shooting in a 112–79 loss to the San Antonio Spurs. He also had three steals and two assists in just over 21 minutes off the bench. Cotton appeared in the Suns' next two games before being waived on January 7, 2016. Five days later, he returned to the Austin Spurs. After appearing in two more games, he parted ways with Austin to sign with the Xinjiang Flying Tigers of the Chinese Basketball Association. In nine games for Xinjiang, he averaged 21.2 points, 3.2 rebounds and 2.7 assists per game.

On April 1, 2016, Cotton signed a 10-day contract with the Memphis Grizzlies. On April 11, he signed with the Grizzlies for the remainder of the 2015–16 regular season. He appeared in five games for the Grizzlies before parting ways with the team prior to the start of the playoffs.

After playing for the Atlanta Hawks during the 2016 NBA Summer League, Cotton signed with Turkish club Anadolu Efes on August 27, 2016. A mutual termination of his contract took place on December 12, 2016, with Cotton citing that the country's safety concerns were a major factor in him leaving. He averaged 8.0 points in 10 EuroLeague games and 10.4 points in seven Turkish League games.

Perth Wildcats (2017–present)

2016–17 season: Championship and Grand Final MVP

By late December 2016, reports surfaced of Cotton's move to Australia to join the Perth Wildcats for the rest of the 2016–17 NBL season. On January 3, 2017, the Wildcats made the signing official. Cotton set a Wildcats scoring record on NBL debut four days later with 26 points against the Sydney Kings, eclipsing James Ennis' 25-point NBL debut with the Wildcats in 2013. In his fifth game for the Wildcats on January 20, Cotton scored a season-high 27 points in an 84–78 overtime win over the Cairns Taipans. In late January, Cotton committed to remaining with the Wildcats for the rest of the season after rejecting a 10-day contract from the Atlanta Hawks. On February 3, he scored a game-high 25 points on 8-of-11 shooting, including five 3-pointers, in a 94–63 win over the Brisbane Bullets. In the Wildcats' regular-season finale on February 12, Cotton scored 19 points in a 96–94 win over Melbourne United. The win propelled the Wildcats into the finals as they finished the regular season in third place with a 15–13 record. At 22.09 points per game, Cotton ousted Casper Ware (22.06) for the NBL's regular season scoring champion.

In game one of the Wildcats' best-of-three semi-final series against the second-seeded Taipans in Cairns on February 17, Cotton had a 34-point effort to lead his team to a 91–69 win. His 34 points were the most scored by a Wildcat in a post-season game since Shawn Redhage had 35 in 2008. He also had a team-high five assists and three steals. Cotton scored nine points in game two in Perth three days later, as the Wildcats defeated the Taipans 74–66 to sweep the series and move on to the NBL Grand Final. The Wildcats went on to sweep the best-of-five grand final series, defeating the Illawarra Hawks 3–0 behind a Grand Final MVP performance from Cotton. Over the three games, Cotton averaged 27.7 points, which included a 45-point effort in a 95–86 title-clinching win in game three. He shot 12-of-17 from the field, 7-of-12 from 3-point range, and 14-of-15 from the free throw line in game three, with his 45 points setting the new all-time NBL Grand Final scoring record. In 16 games for the Wildcats, he averaged 23.1 points, 3.2 rebounds, 3.1 assists and 1.3 steals per game.

2017–18 season: NBL MVP and Club MVP
After attempting to re-enter the NBA via minicamps and the Summer League, Cotton made the decision to return to Perth, re-signing with the Wildcats for 2017–18 NBL season on July 14, 2017. Cotton was considered a long-shot to re-join the Wildcats and reportedly turned down an offer from Spanish club Unicaja Málaga. Cotton was the NBL's highest earner in 2017–18 with a $600,000 contract.

In the Wildcats' season opener on October 7, Cotton scored a game-high 24 points in a 96–86 win over the Brisbane Bullets. On November 9, he scored a game-high 26 points in an 88–84 loss to the New Zealand Breakers. On December 10, he scored a season-high 36 points in a 99–91 win over the Illawarra Hawks, moving the Wildcats to atop the NBL ladder with a 10–3 record. The Wildcats dropped to 13–9 following two horror losses to the Sydney Kings in Round 15. On January 27, 2018, he scored 27 points in a 90–73 win over the Breakers. In the Wildcats' regular-season finale on February 18, Cotton scored a game-high 24 points on 6-of-11 shooting from 3-point range along with six assists in an 89–61 win over the Cairns Taipans. The Wildcats finished the regular season in third place with a 16–12 record, while Cotton finished as the NBL's leader in 3-pointers made with 84. The mark came from 187 attempts, giving him a 3-point shooting percentage of 44.9 – the best in the league for any player taking an average of at least one attempt per game. His 84 3-pointers sits third-most in Wildcats history for a regular season, behind Jermaine Beal (87, 2014) and James Harvey (85, 2006). Cotton also led the league in total points scored with 544, averaging 19.4 points per game. On the eve of the Wildcats' finals campaign, Cotton was named the NBL Most Valuable Player for the 2017–18 season, finishing 23 votes ahead of second place. He became just the third Wildcat to win the award, joining Paul Rogers (2000) and Kevin Lisch (2012). He was also named to his first All-NBL First Team.

In game one of their semi-final series against the second-seeded Adelaide 36ers, the Wildcats were defeated 109–74 despite Cotton's 22-point effort. The Wildcats went on to lose game two 89–88, with Cotton scoring 19 of his game-high 31 points in the first quarter, to bow out of the finals at the hands of a 2–0 sweep. His 19 first-quarter points set a record for any Wildcat in one quarter during a final. Cotton appeared in all 30 games for the Wildcats in 2017–18, averaging 19.8 points, 3.2 rebounds, 3.1 assists and 1.2 steals per game. At the Wildcats MVP Ball, Cotton was crowned the Gordon Ellis Medalist as the club's Most Valuable Player for the 2017–18 season.

On April 3, 2018, Cotton signed with Brescia Leonessa of the Lega Basket Serie A (LBA). In 11 games, he averaged 12.3 points, 2.2 rebounds and 1.9 assists per game.

2018–19 season: Second championship

On June 5, 2018, Cotton signed a three-year deal to return to the Wildcats, with the contract including an NBA out-clause. At the NBL Pre-Season Blitz, Cotton won the Ray Borner Medal as tournament's most valuable player. In the Wildcats' season opener on October 11, Cotton scored 22 points in a 99–91 win over the Adelaide 36ers. On October 27, he scored a game-high 31 points in a 101–96 double-overtime win over Melbourne United. On November 9, he scored a season-high 37 points and hit the game-winning 3-pointer with 0.4 seconds left on the clock to lift the Wildcats to a 90–87 win over the Brisbane Bullets. On November 23, he scored a game-high 24 points in a 98–93 overtime win over the New Zealand Breakers. However, he checked out with two minutes remaining in overtime clutching his right thumb after his hand was pinned on the backboard on a fast break layup. He subsequently missed the Wildcats' following game two days later, a game the Wildcats won to move to 10–1 on the season. He missed a second game on December 6 against the Sydney Kings, before returning to action on December 9, scoring a game-high 21 points in a 94–72 win over the Cairns Taipans. Cotton later missed the Wildcats' New Year's Eve game against the Taipans in Cairns due to hamstring tightness. The Wildcats fell to 12–9 by early January, leading to increasing external pressure for roster changes. Instead, the playing group was backed by the club to return to form and enjoy success in the latter part of the season. On February 10, after going scoreless in the first half, Cotton had 24 of his 27 points in the fourth quarter and overtime of the Wildcats' 95–86 win over Kings. On February 15, he scored 24 of his 29 points in the second half of the Wildcats' 93–85 win over the 36ers, helping the Wildcats secure the minor premiership with a sixth straight win. A loss to Melbourne in overtime in the regular-season finale two days later saw the Wildcats finish with an 18–10 record. Overlooked for NBL MVP, Cotton was named All-NBL First Team and Fan's MVP, and was crowned the league's scoring champion for the second time in three years.

In the Wildcats' semi-final series against the Bullets, Cotton scored a game-high 22 points in an 89–59 win in game one and 19 points in an 84–79 win in game two, helping to sweep the series and move onto the NBL Grand Final. With a career-high 10 assists in game two, Cotton recorded his first career double-double. In game one of the grand final series against Melbourne United, despite going 4-of-16 from the field and 0-of-9 from three, Cotton had eight assists and seven rebounds to go with his 10 points in an 81–71 win. The Wildcats went on to lose game two 92–74 despite Cotton's 19 points and five 3-pointers. In game three, Cotton recorded 16 points and nine assists to help the Wildcats take a 2–1 lead in the series with a 96–67 win. In game four in Melbourne, Cotton scored a game-high 28 points in a 97–84 win, as Cotton claimed his second NBL championship in three years. In 31 games, he averaged 21.8 points, 4.0 rebounds, 3.7 assists and 1.3 steals per game. At the Wildcats MVP Ball, Cotton was crowned the Gordon Ellis Medalist as the club's Most Valuable Player for the 2018–19 season, becoming the ninth Wildcat to win back-to-back club MVP honors.

2019–20 season: NBL MVP, Grand Final MVP and championship
Cotton returned to the Wildcats for the 2019–20 season having had a quiet off-season rehabbing a nagging thumb injury that he withstood throughout the 2018–19 season. In the Wildcats' season opener on October 5, Cotton scored 21 points in a 94–93 win over Melbourne United. On October 20, he scored 27 points and made the game-winning two-pointer to lift the Wildcats to a 95–93 win over United. On November 10, he scored a then season-high 36 points with six 3-pointers in a 104–85 loss to the Sydney Kings. On November 17, he scored 34 points with six 3-pointers in an 88–77 win over the New Zealand Breakers. The Wildcats fell to an 8–5 record after losses to Cairns and Adelaide. Cotton responded with 100 points over the next four games to help the Wildcats win four straight. By the end of that four-game stretch, Cotton had reached 2,000 career points, becoming the 15th Wildcat to do so and the fastest Wildcat to reach the milestone. He did so in 94 games and 3,165 minutes, beating former teammate Shawn Redhage's previous record of 95 games and 3,400 minutes. On December 28, he scored 18 of his season-high 39 points in the fourth quarter and had a then career-high eight 3-pointers in a 98–85 win over the Kings. On February 1, he recorded 30 points and five steals in a 110–100 win over the Kings, becoming the first Wildcat to have 30 points and five steals in a game since Scott Fisher in 1993. Cotton sat out the final regular season game, as the Wildcats earned the second seed for the finals with a 19–9 record. He ended the regular season as the first player in NBL history to lead the league in scoring (22.6) and steals (1.7) in the same season. At the NBL's end-of-season awards night, Cotton was named in the All-NBL First Team for the third straight year and claimed the NBL Most Valuable Player Award for the second time in three years. In doing so, he became the seventh player in NBL history to win the league's MVP award more than once.

In game one of their semi-final series against the Cairns Taipans, Cotton scored 42 points with a career-high 10 3-pointers in a 108–107 overtime win. The Wildcats went on to lose game two with Cotton scoring 11 points, before going on to win game three despite Cotton only scoring five points. In game one of the NBL Grand Final series against the Kings in Sydney, Cotton scored 32 points in an 88–86 win. After scoring a game-high 27 points in a game two loss at home, Cotton had 31 points, seven rebounds and seven assists in a 111–96 win in Sydney in game three. Due to the COVID-19 pandemic, the Kings refused to complete the five-game series. As a result, the NBL announced the Wildcats as the 2020 champions with Cotton named the Grand Final MVP. He became the first player in Wildcats history to be named league MVP, Grand Final MVP and win a championship all in the same season. In 33 games, he averaged 22.9 points, 4.1 rebounds, 4.0 assists and 1.5 steals per game.

For the season, Cotton was crowned the Gordon Ellis Medalist as the club's Most Valuable Player for the third straight year, joining Kevin Lisch, Shawn Redhage and Ricky Grace as three-time winners of the club MVP award.

2020–21 season: Third NBL MVP
On April 30, 2020, Cotton opted out of the final year of his contract due to the salary cuts that were implemented by the NBL to protect the league during the COVID-19 pandemic. After exploring playing opportunities overseas, Cotton re-signed with the Wildcats on a three-year deal reportedly worth $2 million on May 26, 2020. The 2020–21 NBL season began in January 2021. In the Wildcats' season opener on January 24, Cotton recorded 27 points, seven assists and five steals in an 88–76 win over the South East Melbourne Phoenix. He recorded 32 points and six assists five days later in a 90–89 loss to the Phoenix. On February 23, he recorded 30 points and nine assists in a 113–106 win over the Sydney Kings. On March 14, he recorded a season-high 34 points, seven assists and three steals in a 97–88 win over the Adelaide 36ers. He scored 20 second-half points in leading a 26-point comeback. With seven wins in eight NBL Cup games, the Wildcats were crowned winners of the inaugural NBL Cup. On March 22, he set a new season high with 36 points in a 92–82 win over the 36ers. On April 13, he scored 34 points in an 85–79 overtime win over the New Zealand Breakers. He hit the game-tying buzzer-beating 3-pointer at the end of regulation to send the game into overtime. On May 9, he recorded 32 points, 10 assists and six rebounds in a 98–84 win over the Breakers, becoming the first Wildcat since Shawn Redhage in 2006 to have 30 points and 10 assists in a game. On May 24, he was ruled out for the rest of the season after suffering a hematoma to his left quadriceps. He averaged career highs in points (23.5) and assists (5.7), earning his fourth NBL scoring title. He was subsequently named NBL MVP for the third time, becoming the first player to win back-to-back MVPs since Andrew Gaze in 1998 and joined Gaze and Leroy Loggins as the only three-time winners. He was also voted Fan's MVP and named to the All-NBL First Team for the fourth consecutive season. Without Cotton, the Wildcats reached the grand final series but lost in a 3–0 sweep to Melbourne United.

2021–22 season: Fifth scoring title and All-NBL First Team
Cotton entered the 2021–22 season fully recovered from the hematoma and surgery. In the second game of the season on December 5, he scored 31 points in a 90–67 win over the Cairns Taipans. On December 31, he scored 19 of his 29 points in the second quarter of the Wildcats' 84–78 win over the Taipans. He hit five 3-pointers in the game to move to second place (430) on the Wildcats' all-time 3-pointers list. On January 22, 2022, against the Illawarra Hawks, Cotton played his 150th game for the Wildcats. Five days later, also against the Hawks, he helped the Wildcats move to a 7–2 record with a 94–80 win. He scored 20 of his game-high 28 points in the first half. On February 12, he scored 31 points in a 93–87 loss to Melbourne United. On February 19, he scored a game-high 33 points with eight 3-pointers in a 98–95 loss to the Sydney Kings. On March 14, he recorded 32 points, nine rebounds and eight assists in a 104–102 overtime win over the New Zealand Breakers. He made a 3-pointer and was fouled with 1.4 seconds to play, missing the free throw and seeing Perth to the win. Over the next nine games, the Wildcats went 3–6 to finish fifth with a 16–12 record, thus ending the club's 35-year finals appearance streak. In the season finale on April 24, Cotton scored a game-high 28 points in a 102–100 overtime loss to the South East Melbourne Phoenix. For the fourth straight season and the fifth time in six years, Cotton was named NBL scoring champion with 22.7 points per game. He played all 28 games and totalled 635 points, the most points scored by Cotton in a 28-game regular season. He also hit 88 3-pointers, the most ever by a Wildcat in a regular season. He was subsequently named to the All-NBL First Team for the fifth straight year and was named Wildcats Club MVP for the fourth time.

2022–23 season
On May 4, 2022, Cotton re-signed with the Wildcats on a new three-year deal. In the 2022–23 season opener on October 2, he recorded 23 points, 12 rebounds, six assists and six steals in an 87–73 win over the Brisbane Bullets. He became the first NBL player in the league's 40-minute era to record 20+ points, 10+ rebounds, 5+ assists and 5+ steals. With two 3-pointers against the Bullets, he reached 500 career 3-pointers. On January 14, 2023, against the Adelaide 36ers, he moved into fifth on the Wildcats' all-time scoring list. On January 20, he had 21 points and a career-high 11 assists in a 111–104 win over the Sydney Kings. On January 27, he scored 40 points with seven 3-pointers in a 106–86 win over the Illawarra Hawks. It was his first NBL regular-season game with 40 points and the third 40-point game of his NBL career. On February 3, he scored a game-high 28 points to go with 13 rebounds and seven assists in an 84–71 loss to the Cairns Taipans. Two days later, despite Cotton's 1-of-19 from the field, the Wildcats defeated the Kings 96–84 in the final regular season game to qualify for the post-season. For the fifth straight season and the sixth time in seven years, Cotton was named NBL scoring champion with 23.5 points per game. He was also named to the All-NBL First Team for the sixth straight year. In the Play-In Qualifier, Cotton scored 20 of his game-high 26 points in the fourth quarter of the Wildcats' 106–99 win over the South East Melbourne Phoenix. In the Play-In Game three days later, the Wildcats bowed out of the finals with a 91–78 loss to the Taipans, with Cotton recording 19 points and 10 assists.

Career statistics

NBA

Regular season

|-
| style="text-align:left;"| 
| style="text-align:left;"| Utah
| 15 || 0 || 10.6 || .420 || .350 || .833 || 1.2 || 1.0 || .3 || .0 || 5.3
|-
| style="text-align:left;"| 
| style="text-align:left;"| Phoenix
| 3 || 0 || 11.0 || .250 || .000 || .000 || .0 || 1.0 || 1.0 || .0 || 1.3
|-
| style="text-align:left;"| 
| style="text-align:left;"| Memphis
| 5 || 0 || 1.2 || 1.000 || .000 || .000 || .0 || .0 || .0 || .0 || .8
|- class="sortbottom"
| style="text-align:center;" colspan="2"| Career
| 23 || 0 || 8.6 || .418 || .304 || .833 || .8 || .8 || .3 || .0 || 3.8

NBL

Career Statistics

|-
| align="left" | 2016–17
| align="left" | Perth
| 11 || 8 || 32.7 || .472 || .338 || .873 || 2.6 || 3.1 || 0.9 || .1 || 22.1
|-
| align="left" | 2017–18
| align="left" | Perth
| 28 || 28 || 33.0 || .438 || .447 || .881 || 3.2 || 3.1 || 1.2 || .1 || 19.4
|-
| align="left" | 2018–19
| align="left" | Perth
| 25 || 25 || 35.2 || .405 || .361 || .856 || 3.9 || 3.1 || 1.3 || .1 || 22.5
|-
| align="left" | 2019–20
| align="left" | Perth
| 27 || 27 || 33.9 || .426 || .385 || .830 || 4.0 || 3.7 || 1.7 || .1 || 22.6
|- 
| align="left" | 2020–21
| align="left" | Perth
| 32 || 31 || 35.2 || .407 || .317 || .900 || 2.9 || 5.6 || 1.5 || .1 || 23.5
|-
| align="left" | 2021–22
| align="left" | Perth
| 28 || 28 || 35.2 || .412 || .359 || .913 || 3.8 || 4.8 || 1.4 || .1 || 22.7
|- class="sortbottom"
| style="text-align:center;" colspan="2"| Career
| 174 || 170 || 34.2 || .427 || .367 || .875 || 3.4 || 3.9 || 1.3 || .1 || 22.2

Personal life
Cotton is the son of Yvonne and Charles Cotton. He has one brother, Justin Tarpley, and two half-brothers, Chaz Cotton and Elijah Cotton. One of his brothers died by suicide in 2021. His uncle, David Adams, played football at the University of Arizona and had a short stint with the Dallas Cowboys in the NFL.

Cotton's wife Rachel is from Perth. They met each other on an Australian beach. The couple's first child, a daughter, was born in Australia in November 2019.

In February 2021, Cotton received his Australian Distinguished Talent visa and permanent residency, roughly 17 months after initially lodging an application for Australian citizenship. By January 2023, his continued delayed citizenship status led to immigration lawyers criticising the Federal government.

References

External links

NBL profile
Providence Friars bio
"Cottoning on to the NBL" at nbl.com.au
"Bryce Cotton: Why I chose to return to Perth Wildcats" at thewest.com.au
"Cotton Could End up Greatest Ever Wildcat" at nbl.com.au
"The Top Ten Moments of Bryce Cotton's First 100 NBL Games" at nbl.com.au
"NBL star Bryce Cotton leaning towards Perth Wildcats return" at espn.com.au
"From NBA misfit to the LeBron James of the NBL: Bryce Cotton’s puzzling path to greatness" at foxsports.com.au

1992 births
Living people
African-American basketball players
American expatriate basketball people in Australia
American expatriate basketball people in China
American expatriate basketball people in Italy
American expatriate basketball people in Turkey
American men's basketball players
Anadolu Efes S.K. players
Austin Spurs players
Basket Brescia Leonessa players
Basketball players from Tucson, Arizona
Memphis Grizzlies players
Perth Wildcats players
Phoenix Suns players
Point guards
Providence Friars men's basketball players
Shooting guards
Undrafted National Basketball Association players
Utah Jazz players
Xinjiang Flying Tigers players
21st-century African-American sportspeople